Spencer County High School is a public high school located in Taylorsville, Kentucky.

Athletics
Spencer County's school colors are royal blue and white and their nicknames are Bears (boys) and Lady Bears (girls). Through the Kentucky High School Athletic Association, Spencer County participates in the following sports:

{| class="wikitable sortable"
!colspan="3"|Spencer County High School Sports and Activities
|-
! Level
! Gender
! Sport / Activity
|-
| Varsity ||  || Archery
|-
| Varsity ||  || Baseball
|-
| Varsity || Boys || Basketball
|-
| Varsity || Girls || Basketball 
|-
| Varsity ||  || Cheerleading
|-
| Varsity || Boys || Cross Country
|-
| Varsity || Girls || Cross Country 
|-
| Varsity ||  || Dance
|-
| Varsity ||  || Fast Pitch Softball
|-
| Varsity ||  || Fishing
|-
| Varsity ||  || Football
|-
| Varsity || Boys || Golf
|-
| Varsity || Girls || Golf 
|-
| Varsity || Boys || Soccer
|-
| Varsity || Girls || Soccer 
|-
| Varsity || Boys || Swimming
|-
| Varsity || Girls || Swimming 
|-
| Varsity || Boys || Tennis
|-
| Varsity || Girls || Tennis 
|-
| Varsity || Boys || Track
|-
| Varsity || Girls || Track 
|-
| Varsity ||  || Volleyball
|-
| Varsity ||  || Wrestling
|-
| Junior Varsity ||  || Baseball
|-
| Junior Varsity || Boys || Basketball
|-
| Junior Varsity || Girls || Basketball 
|-
| Junior Varsity ||  || Fast Pitch Softball
|-
| Junior Varsity ||  || Football
|-
| Junior Varsity || Boys || Soccer
|-
| Junior Varsity ||  || Volleyball
|-
| Freshman || Boys || Basketball
|-
| Freshman || Girls || Basketball 
|-
| Freshman ||  || Volleyball
|}

Demographics
As of the 2018–2019 school year, Spencer County High School enrolled 912 students. 828 identified as white, 36 identified as Hispanic, thirty identified as multiracial, 12 identified as black, four identified as Asian, and two identified as American Indian/Alaska native.

References

External links

Public high schools in Kentucky
Buildings and structures in Taylorsville, Kentucky